The Saraswati Samman is an annual award for outstanding prose or poetry literary works in any of the 22 languages of India listed in Schedule VIII of the Constitution of India. It is named after the Hindu goddess of knowledge, Saraswati.

The Saraswati Samman was instituted in 1991 by the K. K. Birla Foundation. It consists of ₹15,00,000, a citation and a plaque. Candidates are selected from literary works published in the previous ten years by a panel that included scholars and former award winners. The inaugural award was given to Harivanshrai 'Bachchan' for his four volume autobiography,  Kya Bhooloon Kya Yaad Karoon, Needa Ka Nirman Phir, Basere Se Door and Dashdwar se Sopan Tak.

Awardees

Notes

External links
 
 

Indian literary awards
 
Awards established in 1991
1991 establishments in India